Ramire Rosan (14 April 1895 – 24 May 2004) was the last World War I veteran from the overseas departments and territories of France. Grandson of a slave, he was born in Morne-à-l'Eau, Guadeloupe, where he was cultivating sugar cane. Mounted gendarmes came to pick him up and sent him immediately to a base, he was enlisted to the twenty-third regiment of the colonial infantry. In July 1916 he took part in the Battle of the Somme, where he was gassed.

He received four medals, including, in 1996, the Légion d'honneur.

He died in Guadeloupe in 2004, at the age of 109.

Distinctions 
 Legion of Honour (1996)
 Combatant's Cross
 1914–1918 Commemorative war medal (France)
 1914–1918 Inter-Allied Victory medal

References

1895 births
2004 deaths
French centenarians
Men centenarians
French military personnel of World War I
Chevaliers of the Légion d'honneur
Guadeloupean soldiers